Horace Pippin (February 22, 1888 – July 6, 1946) was a self-taught American artist who painted a range of themes, including scenes inspired by his service in World War I, landscapes, portraits, and biblical subjects. Some of his best-known works address the U.S.'s history of slavery and racial segregation. He was the first Black artist to be the subject of a monograph, Selden Rodman's Horace Pippin, A Negro Painter in America (1947), and the New York Times eulogized him as the "most important Negro painter" in American history. He is buried at Chestnut Grove Cemetery Annex in West Goshen Township, Chester County, Pennsylvania. A Pennsylvania State historical Marker at 327 Gay Street, West Chester, Pennsylvania identifies his home at the time of his death and commemorates his accomplishments.

Early life
He was born in West Chester, Pennsylvania, on February 22, 1888, to Harriet Pippin; his father's identity is unknown. He grew up in and around Goshen, New York, but would return to West Chester in adulthood. In Goshen, he attended segregated schools until he was 15, when he went to work to support his ailing mother. As a boy, Horace responded to an art supply company's advertising contest and won his first set of crayons and a box of watercolors. As a youngster, Pippin made drawings of racehorses and jockeys from Goshen's celebrated, trotter (horse) racetrack. Prior to his service in World War I, Pippin worked as a hotel porter, a furniture packer, and an iron moulder.  He was a member of St. John's African Union Methodist Protestant Church. In 1920, Pippin married Jennie Fetherstone Wade Giles, who had been widowed twice and had a six-year-old-son.

World War I
In World War I, Pippin served in K Company, the 3rd Battalion of the 369th infantry regiment, known for their bravery in battle as the famous Harlem Hellfighters. The predominately Black unit faced a segregated US Army, especially before they were transferred to the command of the French Army. They were the longest serving U.S. regiment on the war's frontlines, holding their ground against enemy fire almost continuously from early April until the end of the war. The regiment as a whole was awarded the French Croix de Guerre. In September 1918, Pippin was shot in the right shoulder by a German sniper. The injury initially cost him the use of his arm and always limited his range of motion. He was honorably discharged in 1919. He was retroactively awarded a Purple Heart for his combat injury in 1945. He said of his combat experience:I did not care what or where I went. I asked God to help me, and he did so. And that is the way I came through that terrible and Hellish place. For the whole entire battlefield was hell, so it was no place for any human being to be.

After the war, Pippin created four memoirs—one illustrated—that describe his harrowing military service in detail. He returned to war subjects periodically throughout the 1930s and 1940s, and later said that WWI "brought out all the art in me".

Career

Pippin took up art in the 1920s, reportedly in part to rehabilitate his injured arm, and began painting on stretched fabric in 1930 with The Ending of the War: Starting Home.  He later explained his creative process: "The pictures which I have already painted come to me in my mind, and if to me it is a worth while picture, I paint it." He addressed a range of themes, from landscapes and still lifes to biblical subjects and political statements. Some draw on his personal experience of the war or turn-of-the-century domestic life.

He was "discovered" when he submitted two paintings to a local art show—the Chester County Art Association (CCAA) Annual Exhibition—reportedly with the aid and encouragement of various locals, including CCAA co-founders art critic Christian Brinton and artist N.C. Wyeth. Brinton immediately organized a solo exhibition, cosponsored by the CCAA and the interracial West Chester Community Center, connected him with MoMA curators Dorothy Miller and Holger Cahill and, by 1940, the Philadelphia art dealer Robert Carlen and collector Albert C. Barnes. Pippin attended art appreciation classes at the Barnes Foundation in the spring 1940 semester. Carlen, Barnes, and, starting in 1941, dealer Edith Gregor Halpert played prominent roles in Pippin's career.

In the eight years between his national debut in the Museum of Modern Art's traveling exhibition “Masters of Popular Painting” (1938) and his death at the age of fifty-eight, Pippin's recognition grew exponentially across the country and internationally. During this period, he had solo exhibitions in commercial galleries in Philadelphia (1940, 1941) and New York (1940, 1944), and at the Arts Club of Chicago (1941) and San Francisco Museum of Modern Art (1942). Private collections and museums such as the Barnes Foundation, the Philadelphia Museum of Art and the Whitney Museum of American Art acquired his works. His paintings were featured in annual or biennials at the Art Institute of Chicago, Chicago, IL; Carnegie Institute, Pittsburgh, PA; Corcoran Gallery of Art, Washington, D.C.; Pennsylvania Academy of the Fine Arts, Philadelphia, PA; and the Whitney Museum of American Art, New York, as well as thematic surveys at the Dayton Art Institute, OH; National Gallery of Art, Washington, D.C.; Newark Museum, Newark, NJ; and Tate Gallery, London, UK.

In the catalogue for one of his memorial exhibitions in 1947, critic Alain Locke described Pippin as "a real and rare genius, combining folk quality with artistic maturity so uniquely as almost to defy classification."

Artworks
Pippin's oeuvre includes a variety of subjects and compositional strategies. He began in the 1920s by burning designs into wood panels—mostly snow scenes—and adding paint in one or two colors to highlight specific components of the image.

His first oil painting, The Ending of the War, Starting Home (1930–1933), depicts a scene informed by his experience at the Battle of Sechault, where he was shot. (It does not depict the official German surrender on November 11, 1918, which happened as he was recovering in a French hospital.) He also made the frame and decorated it with hand-carved war materiel, including German and French helmets and weapons. He painted World War I several times thereafter in the 1930s and once more in 1945. 

Pippin painted several religious subjects, both those illustrating Bible passages and more visionary statements like his Holy Mountain series. He was a religious man, staying close to the church throughout his life by teaching Sunday school and singing in his church choir.

Among Pippin's most celebrated pictures are the three paintings of his Holy Mountain series, which are reminiscent of the bucolic Peaceable Kingdom paintings of Quaker artist Edward Hicks that depict predators and prey together. Pippin includes elements drawn for his own time to suggests that discord and harmony are never too far apart. The wooded backgrounds include soldiers, graveyards, war planes, and bombs that are at odds with the peace depicted in the foreground. In The Knowledge of God and The Holy Mountain III, the tiny brown figure hanging in the trees refers to the ongoing scourge of lynching in the segregated southern United States.  He links concepts of destruction and peace by inscribing a significant date from WWII on each of the paintings. The Holy Mountain I is marked with "June 6, 1944", the date of the Allied landings at Normandy, known as of D-Day. The Knowledge of God is marked "Dec. 7 1944," the third anniversary of the attack on Pearl Harbor. Lastly, The Holy Mountain III is marked "Aug 9, 1945", the day the United States dropped an atomic bomb on Nagasaki, Japan. Some have argued that centrally placed shepherd figure resembles the artist. Pippin's dealer Robert Carlen took credit for exposing Pippin to Hicks' series as he was a principle advocate for both self-taught artists.

Pippin painted two self portraits, including one seated at the easel. His painting of John Brown Going to his Hanging (1942) is in the collection of the Pennsylvania Academy of the Fine Arts in Philadelphia is part of a trilogy on the abolitionist sometimes credited with igniting the Civil War.

Mr. Prejudice, made in the midst of World War II at the request of an unidentified patron, is unique in Pippin's oeuvre for its experimental composition and symbolic program. The relatively small image—about the size of a magazine cover—sorts the figures by race. The lower left quadrant is filled with Black uniformed military, a medic, and a machinist, most of whom face forward toward the viewer. Some read the brown-skinned figure at center left, outfitted in an anachronistic WWI uniform, as a self-portrait. A similar group of white men fill the lower right quadrant, most of them turning toward the left. The upper register is dominated by a white man with a sledgehammer driving a wedge into a large V, a reference to the Allies' "V for Victory" slogan in WWII. African Americans devised the "Double V" campaign to advocate for military victory abroad and victory over racism at home. At upper left, a large, brown-skinned Statue of Liberty raises her torch to light the way to freedom. On the upper right, a broad, lighter-skinned figure dressed in red holds a noose and stares at Lady Liberty, while a hooded Ku Klux Klansman looms above him.

Pippin's genre paintings are among his most popular works; see, for example, the Domino Game (1943), in the Phillips Collection, Washington D.C., and several versions of Cabin in the Cotton. Some, including After Supper (ca. 1935–1939) and The Milkman of Goshen (1945), relate to his childhood in New York State. Views of the everyday activities of Black families  "tended to be relatively invisible to the white masses" before the Great Migration, so Pippin's domestic scenes offered a privileged view.

Pippin also created images related to popular culture, including Old Black Joe, based on the song Old Black Joe; Uncle Tom, based on the novel Uncle Tom's Cabin and its many adaptations, and maybe the musical and film Cabin in the Sky. He made two portraits of the celebrated Black contralto Marian Anderson, not long after her famous 1939 concert on the steps of the Lincoln Memorial, and dedicated a painting to Paul Robeson.

Pippin left The Park Bench unfinished in his studio at this death in 1946. Romare Bearden later said: "the man, I think, symbolizes Pippin himself, who, having completed his journey and his mission, sits wistfully, in the autumn of the year, all alone on a park bench."

Collections and retrospective exhibitions

Pippin painted about 140 works, many in museum collections, including the Metropolitan Museum of Art, New York, NY; Hirshhorn Museum and Sculpture Garden, Washington, D.C.; Pennsylvania Academy of the Fine Arts, Philadelphia, PA; Philadelphia Museum of Art, Philadelphia, PA; The Barnes Foundation, Philadelphia, PA; the Brandywine River Museum, Chadds Ford, Pennsylvania; the Phillips Collection, Washington, D.C.; Baltimore Museum of Art, Baltimore, MD; and San Francisco Museum of Modern Art, San Francisco, CA.

Pippin was the first African American artist to be the subject of a monograph, Selden Rodman's Horace Pippin: A Negro Painter in America of 1947. He has since been the subject of three major retrospective exhibitions, several scholarly books and articles, a book of poetry, and several children's books.

 Horace Pippin. Phillips Collection, Washington, D.C., February 25–March 1977; Terry Dintenfass Gallery, New York, April 5–30, 1977; and Brandywine River Museum of Art, Chadds Ford, Pa., June 4–September 5, 1977.
 I Tell My Heart: The Art of Horace Pippin. Pennsylvania Academy of the Fine Arts, Philadelphia, January 21–April 17, 1994; Art Institute of Chicago, April 30–July 10, 1994; Cincinnati Art Museum, July 28–October 9, 1994; Baltimore Museum of Art, October 26, 1994 – January 1, 1995; and the Metropolitan Museum of Art, February 1–April 30, 1995. 
 Horace Pippin: The Way I See It. Brandywine River Museum of Art, Chadds Ford, Pa., April 25–July 19, 2015

Notes

Sources

 Barnes, Albert. "Horace Pippin." In Horace Pippin Exhibition, exh. cat., Carlen Gallery. Philadelphia, 1940.
Bearden, Romare. "Horace Pippin." In Horace Pippin, exh. cat., The Phillips Collection. Washington, D.C., 1976.
Bernier, Celeste-Marie. Suffering and Sunset: World War I in the Art and Life of Horace Pippin. Philadelphia: Temple University Press, 2015.
Conn, Steve. "The Politics of Painting: Horace Pippin the Historian", American Studies (Spring 1997): pp. 5–26
Forgey, Benjamin, "Horace Pippin's 'personal spiritual journey'", ARTnews 76 (Summer 1977): pp. 74–75
Lewis, Audrey M. Horace Pippin: The Way I See It, exh. cat. Brandywine River Museum of Art, Chadds Ford, Pa., 2015
Locke, Alain. "Horace Pippin." In Horace Pippin Memorial Exhibition, exh. cat. The Art Alliance, April 8–May 4, 1947. Philadelphia, 1947.
Monahan, Anne. Horace Pippin, American Modern. New Haven: Yale University Press, 2020.
Monahan, Anne. "Horace Pippin's Self-Portraits," Yale University Press Blog, 22 February 2020. http://blog.yalebooks.com/2020/02/22/horace-pippins-self-portraits/
"Pippin, Horace." Grolier Encyclopedia of Knowledge, vol. 15. Grolier, 1991, 
Rodman, Selden. Horace Pippin: A Negro Painter in America. New York: Quadrangle, 1947.
Stein, Judith E. et al. I Tell My Heart: The Art of Horace Pippin, ex. cat. Philadelphia: Pennsylvania Academy of the Fine Arts, 1993.  For the full text of Stein's essay, "An American Original," see her website 
Zilczer, Judith. "A Not-So-Peaceable Kingdom: Horace Pippin's Holy Mountain," Archives of American Art Journal, 41 (Jan 2001): 18–33, https://doi.org/10.1086/aaa.41.1_4.1557755

Further reading
 Bryant, Jen. A Splash of Red: The Life and Art of Horace Pippin. New York, 2013.
 Harrington, Janice N. Primitive: The Art and Life of Horace H. Pippin. BOA Editions Ltd., 2016.

External links 

 Horace Pippin links
 Horace Pippin Notebook and Letters Online at the Smithsonian's Archives of American Art

20th-century American painters
American male painters
Naïve painters
1888 births
1946 deaths
American people with disabilities
People from West Chester, Pennsylvania
People from Goshen, New York
Social realist artists
Self-taught artists
20th-century African-American painters
20th-century American male artists